Miguel Arcángel Roscigna (1891–1936) was a blacksmith, politician, fugitive, and a militant Argentine anarchist who was notable for his activity in Argentine expropriative anarchism.

Roscigna became a member of political party Unión de Sindicatos Argentinos, (Union of Argentine Syndicates) and had deemed current actions as insufficient for the release of prisoners, Roscigna decided towards a more violent approach, expropriative anarchism. In November 1918 he traveled to the Ushuaia Prison where Simon Radowitzky was serving his sentence. Although Radowitzky managed to escape initially, he was later captured and returned to prison.

Roscigna was wanted for crimes and had fled Argentina. Roscigna was later sent to prison in 1927 after being captured. After Roscigna was released from prison, he disappeared in 1936.

See also 
 Illegalism
 List of people who disappeared
 Severino Di Giovanni

References

Further reading 

1891 births
1930s missing person cases
1931 deaths
Argentine anti-fascists
Argentine anarchists
Extrajudicial killings
Fugitives
Illegalists
Insurrectionary anarchists
Enforced disappearances in Argentina
Missing person cases in Argentina

Murdered anarchists